Pauline Armitage is a former politician in Northern Ireland, who was a Member of the Northern Ireland Assembly (MLA) for  East Londonderry from 1998 to 2003.

Based in Coleraine, Armitage joined the Young Unionists in 1969.  She served in the Ulster Defence Regiment before being elected to Coleraine Borough Council for the Ulster Unionist Party (UUP) in 1985.  She served as the Mayor of Coleraine from 1995 to 1997.

In 1996 she was an unsuccessful candidate in the Northern Ireland Forum election in East Londonderry. In 1998, Armitage was elected to the Northern Ireland Assembly, representing East Londonderry.  In this session of the Assembly, she occasionally voted against the party line, supporting a Democratic Unionist Party motion for Sinn Féin MLAs to be excluded from the Executive.  In November 2001, she was suspended from the UUP, at the same time that Peter Weir was expelled from the party, after the two voted against party leader David Trimble's re-appointment as First Minister.

Armitage sat as an independent Unionist for the remainder of the session. In June 2003, she resigned her membership of the UUP, quickly joining the UK Unionist Party (UKUP). She stood unsuccessfully for the UKUP in East Londonderry at the 2003 Assembly election, taking only 906 votes.

References

External links
Pauline Armitage: Dissenting ex-soldier, BBC News
The Northern Ireland Assembly

Year of birth missing (living people)
Living people
Mayors of Coleraine
Northern Ireland MLAs 1998–2003
Female members of the Northern Ireland Assembly
UK Unionist Party politicians
Ulster Defence Regiment soldiers
Ulster Unionist Party MLAs
Women mayors of places in Northern Ireland
Independent members of the Northern Ireland Assembly
20th-century women politicians from Northern Ireland
21st-century women politicians from Northern Ireland